Dorfen is a town in the district of Erding, in Bavaria, Germany. It is situated 50 km east of Munich and 29 km south of Landshut.

Transportation 

Dorfen is situated at the Munich-Mühldorf railway.

People 
 Johann Georg von Dillis (1759–1841), Painter
 Hermann Wandinger (1897–1976), Sculptor
 Jochen Mass (born 1946), Racing driver
 Michael Mittermeier (born 1966), Comedian

References

Erding (district)